William Hancock may refer to:
William Augustus Hancock (1831–1902), American pioneer, surveyor, engineer, politician, and jurist
William Hancock (priest), Anglican priest in Australia
William Hancock (ophthalmologist) (1873–1910), English ophthalmologist and sportsman
William Hancock Sr. (judge) (died 1762), commissioned Hancock House in Lower Alloways Creek Township, New Jersey
William Hancock Jr. (judge) (died 1778), mortally wounded at the Hancock's Bridge massacre
Billy Hancock (1946–2018), American singer, guitarist, and recording artist
Keith Hancock (historian) (William Keith Hancock, 1898–1988), Australian historian
William Hancock of Pendle Hall, Lower Higham, Padiham, Lancaster, father-in-law of Thomas Anderton (1611–1671) 
William Hancock (botanist) (1847–1914), commemorated by Cyathea hancockii
William Hancock (brewer) of Hancocks Brewery in the South West of England, father of Frank, Froude and William Hancock
William Hancock (rugby), England national rugby union player, Newport RFC, and Salford (RL), first capped 1955
William J. Hancock, headmaster of Bastrop Academy, who commissioned Fowler House in 1852
William John Hancock (1864–1931), telephone and X-ray pioneer in Western Australia
William Hancock (architect), British architect, Gate Cinema
Bill Hancock, a Canadian Alliance candidate in the 2000 Canadian federal election